"100 Grandkids" is a song recorded by American rapper Mac Miller for his third studio album GO:OD AM (2015). It was released on August 7, 2015, by Warner Bros. Records as the lead single from Miller's major label debut album. The song is divided into two parts: "Grandkids", produced by Sha Money XL, and "100 Grand" produced by ID Labs.

Background
Miller premiered "100 Grandkids" at the Grassroots Music Festival in Council Bluffs, Iowa, on July 31, 2015. The song was officially released by Warner Bros. Records as the lead single from his third studio album and major label debut GO:OD AM on August 7, 2015.

"100 Grandkids" is a two-part song, split between "Grandkids"—promising to give his mother grandkids—and "100 Grand"—recalling when he "first made a hundred grand". The first part was produced by Sha Money XL, and the second by ID Labs. Miller described the two parts as "thinking about your future" and "thinking about yourself", respectively. The song samples P. Diddy, Black Rob and Mark Curry's "Bad Boy for Life" and Norman Connors' "Last Tango in Paris".

Music video
The music video was released on the same day as the official audio. Directed by Nick Walker, the video is split into two parts like the song, beginning with Miller rapping as the moon in a play performed by children dressed in costumes. It transitions to Miller rapping in an empty parking lot beside a car bouncing with hydraulics.

Track listing
Digital download
 "100 Grandkids" – 4:38
Digital download – Radio Edit
 "100 Grandkids (Short Radio Edit)" – 3:58

Personnel

 Malcolm McCormick – lead vocals (as Mac Miller), songwriting
 Elle Varner – additional background vocals
 Michael Clervoix – production (as Sha Money XL), songwriting
 Eric Dan – production (as ID Labs), songwriting, mixing
 Jeremy Kulousek – production (as ID Labs), songwriting, recorded by
 Zach Vaughan – production (as ID Labs), songwriting
 Josh Berg – additional production, recorded by
 Dorsey Wesley – songwriting
 Drayton Goss – songwriting
 Mark Curry – songwriting
 Robert Ross – songwriting
 Jamel Fisher – songwriting
 Gato Barbieri – songwriting
 Dory Previn – songwriting
 Jaslyn Taylee-Edgar – choir
 Jordan Dame – choir
 Nikki Leonti – choir
 Ryan Edgar – choir
 Christian Wunderlich – guitar
 Ben Adamson – organ, trumpet
 Chris Athens – mastering
 Dave Huffman – mastering

Credits adapted from Tidal and ASCAP.

Charts

References

2015 singles
2015 songs
Mac Miller songs
Songs written by Mac Miller
Songs with lyrics by Dory Previn